WDMI-LD virtual channel 62, redirected from channel 26, is a digital low-power Christian television station in Minneapolis, Minnesota. Its main affiliation is with the Daystar network. It broadcasts with a 15 kW signal from its Arden Hills, Minnesota tower, which it shares with stations KTCJ-LD channel 50, a Cornerstone Television Network affiliate, and Global Christian Network(GCN) affiliate KHVM-LD channel 48. The station's tower was hit by lightning around Memorial Day 2010, forcing all three stations to temporarily go silent. WDMI-LD used this as an opportunity to convert from analog to digital, and returned to the air faster than either KHVM-LD or KTCJ-LD.

Digital channels

External links
 Daystar website
 RabbitEars.info website

Low-power television stations in the United States
Television stations in Minneapolis–Saint Paul
Television channels and stations established in 1990
1990 establishments in Minnesota